Bellis annua, the annual daisy, is a plant species in the genus Bellis. It is native in Europe. This species grow from 3 - 12 centimeters.

References

annua
Plants described in 1753
Taxa named by Carl Linnaeus
Flora of Malta